The Department of Geography in the College of Arts & Sciences at the University of Kentucky offers undergraduate degrees and graduate degrees and courses in physical and human geography. The department has an international reputation for the study of social theory and critical geography, including political ecology. Located in Lexington, Kentucky, the department is consistently ranked among leading geography graduate programs in the United States. The graduate students have organized the annual international conference, Dimensions of Political Ecology or DOPE, since 2010. In the summer of 2012, the department and faculty offices moved to the eighth floor of Patterson Office Tower.

Since 1973, the department has named a scholar the Bluegrass Day Speaker (formerly named for Ellen Churchill Semple). This internationally renowned individual delivers an afternoon address and evening remarks at an awards ceremony. Past Bluegrass Day Speakers have included David Harvey, Anne Buttimer, Peirce F. Lewis, Harm de Blij, Eric Sheppard, Jamie Peck, Lynn Staeheli, Trevor J. Barnes, and Sarah Whatmore.

History
In the 1920s and 1930s, few universities in the American South employed geographers. While there was evidence of interest in geography both in and outside the University of Kentucky, educators deplored the meager offerings and the ineffective teaching of geography in the state's secondary schools. Indeed, there were preparatory courses in geography in the course catalog of the University of Kentucky at the founding of the institution; the earliest course on record being Ancient and Modern Geography in 1865. Educators were pleading for more effective geographic instruction and the business world was demanding a content of more practical value. Among the prominent American geographers, Ellen Churchill Semple, a native of Louisville, Kentucky, informally encouraged Frank L. McVey, President of the University of Kentucky, to establish a geography program, when in 1920 she donated to the university the Cullum Geographical Medal (awarded to her in 1914 by the American Geographical Society). The need for a separate geography program was clearly demonstrated during the next two decades, but it was the decision of the recently appointed president, Herman Lee Donovan, to recommend the establishment of a Geography Department within the College of Arts and Sciences early in the summer of 1944.

UK Geography would begin active work at the opening of the fall semester in September 1944. Since 1923, well before the establishment of the department, courses titled Physiography, Elements of Geography, Economic Geography, Conservation of Natural Resources, Land Problems, Geography of North America, and Geographic Basis of American History had been offered in departments of Geology, Economics, History, and Agriculture. These geography courses were transferred to the new department and additional course offerings in geography were approved for undergraduate and master's degree programs. Joseph R. Schwendeman, who earned a PhD from Clark University in 1941, was appointed head of the new department.

With J. R. Schwendeman as head, and three assistant professors, Harry K. Hutter and Guy N. Parmenter (also from Clark) and Thomas P. Field (from UNC-Chapel Hill) and an associate professor, Richard L. Tuthill (Columbia University), the new department had five full-time faculty and an enrollment of 354 students from 1944 to 1945. In 1952, James Shear (Clark) and Daniel Jacobson (LSU) joined the department to teach climatology and cultural geography. The department, along with anthropology and sociology, established an interdisciplinary general education course for first year students attending the university after World War II entitled Societies Around the World. This two-semester program was taught by members of the three departments for most of the next two decades. Three societies were studied each semester. The first course examined the Eskimo, the Navajo, and Buganda in East Africa; the second analyzed three other areas: China, the Cotton South (in the U.S.), and the British Midlands. Thousands of students were enrolled in these courses to satisfy lower level requirements. It was a bold academic enterprise in multidisciplinary and cross-disciplinary studies led by the geography department. With the support of the Sears Roebuck Foundation, the department also maintained a summer field studies program at this time in Monterrey, Mexico.
 
In the mid-1960s the department added new faculty to replace those who accepted positions elsewhere. William Withington (Northwestern University) joined to teach economic geography and North America; P. P. Karan (Indiana University) to teach Asia and physical geography; and Forrest McElhoe (Ohio State University) to teach regional and human geography. Faculty members were also involved in various international activities. James Shear spent 1957 to 1959 in Antarctica as part of the International Geophysical Year program; P.P. Karan spent 1957 to 1958 in Nepal as an assistant on the United Nations team that developed the first Five Year Plan for the country, and in 1964 to 1966 as leader of the Geographical Expedition to Bhutan Himalaya project supported by the National Geographic Society.
 
Between 1950 and 1960 the department averaged about 70 majors each year. There were 21 master's degrees awarded and 2,841 students were enrolled in geography courses from 1966 to 1967. Three of these earned a PhD in geography: Paul Cooper at University of Georgia; Sanford Bederman at University of Minnesota, and Richard Silvernail at University of North Carolina at Chapel Hill. The first MA was granted in 1948 to Wilton Tucker, who taught at a college in Lake Worth, FL. The department's influence was strongest on education throughout Kentucky and in neighboring states. Kentucky MA degree students were employed at Eastern Kentucky University, East Tennessee State University, Marshall University, Morehead State University, Appalachian State University, Minnesota, Southeastern Louisiana, Austin Peay, Western Carolina University, and as high school teachers, climatologists, and city planners in various places throughout the South. In 1967, Schwendeman received the Meritorious Achievement award from the American Association of Geographers, the AAG's highest honor. That summer, he retired after serving as head of department for 23 years.

There have been ten chairs of the department since Schwendeman's term as Head (a designation no longer used at the university),
 Joseph R. Schwendeman, 1944-1967 (Head)
 P.P. Karan 1967-1975
 Karl Raitz, 1975-1980, 1991 (interim), 1996-2008
 Stan Brunn, 1980-1988
 Richard Ulack, 1988-1996
 Susan Roberts 2008-2012
 Anna Secor, 2012-2013 (interim)
 Richard Schein, 2013-2017
 Patricia Ehrkamp, 2017-2022
 Matthew Zook, 2019-2020 (interim)
 Matthew Wilson, 2022-2023 (interim)

The first doctorates were awarded in 1972 to Thomas P. Grimes and Robert Daniel Joseph. The first PhDs awarded to women were Janice Averitt (1975), Helen Parson (1976), who taught at Wilfrid Laurier University, Macel Marteva Wheeler (1977), who taught at Northern Kentucky University, and Wilma Walker (1977) who taught at Eastern Kentucky University.

Graduate program

Following a national search, Karan was named as chair in 1967. In 1967, the old Social Sciences Building which housed the department (on the site of the present Fine Arts Library) was gutted by fire. The department moved to temporary quarters in Breckinridge Hall for two years (1967 to 1969). In the fall of 1969, the department moved to the fourteenth floor of Patterson Office Tower. A doctoral program was established in 1968 and the faculty size increased from four (Field, Karan, Withington, and McElhoe), to twelve by the mid 1970s: Dietrich Zimmer (Heidelberg), Donald Blome (Iowa), Paul Cooper (Georgia), Melvin Albaum (Ohio State), Gary Fowler (Syracuse), Roger McCoy (Kansas), Philip Phillips (Minnesota), Geoffrey Wall (Hull), Karl Raitz (Minnesota), Richard Jones (Ohio State), Ronald Garst (Michigan State), Richard Ulack (Penn State). Wilford Bladen (Kentucky) joined the department in 1973 to strengthen the program on Kentucky geography. In subsequent years, some of the departing faculty were replaced by new appointments, including Richard Towber (Washington) and Allan Fitzsimmons (UCLA).

In 1975 Karl Raitz was named chair. Student enrollment in the program approached 2500 students each semester in the 1970s. Between 1967 and 1980, the department awarded 53 MA and 23 PhD degrees. Graduates of the department were employed at universities in Wisconsin, Minnesota, Kansas, Ohio, Taiwan, Saudi Arabia, Jordan, and Canada in addition to colleges and universities in Kentucky. Others held positions in state and city planning boards, in the U.S. government, and in civil service programs. Departmental interest in overseas areas grew rapidly during this period. The faculty conducted research in the Philippines, Indonesia, Sumatra, Western Australia, and the Himalaya and Japan with support from various funding agencies. This period also marked increased interest in the department's immediate surroundings with the publication of the first comprehensive Atlas of Kentucky (1976), an effort that involved the entire faculty.

To improve its standing on campus and in the state, the department received permission to hire two mid-level faculty members with established research records. In 1977 the department hired Tom Leinbach (Penn State) and Gary Shannon (Michigan) who moved to Lexington, from the University of Vermont and the University of Florida respectively. At the same time, several recent PhDs were added to the program; they included Robert Cromley (Ohio State), Justin Friberg (Syracuse), Hank Bullamore (Iowa), and Jim Hufferd (Minnesota). The department was authorized to conduct a national search for a new chair, and Stan Brunn (Ohio State) was appointed chair, moving from Michigan State University in 1980.

During the next several years, the department experienced growth in a number of areas, including bringing in new faculty members. Some came on tenure lines, others as temporary, especially during tight budget times, and still others replacing those who moved elsewhere. The temporary faculty played important roles in the department's instruction, research and service missions. They included Percy Dougherty (Boston), George Hepner (Arizona State), Susan Macey (Illinois), Susan Trussler-Black (Penn State), and Jacqueline Pryce-Harvey (Tennessee). Lizbeth Pyle (Minnesota) was the first woman employed on a tenure stream line; she joined the department in 1983. Carl Amrhein (SUNY Buffalo) was in the department for two years in the mid-1980s. John Paul Jones III (Ohio State), Graham Rowles (Clark), and John Watkins (Colorado) also came in the mid-1980s to bolster the department's strengths in human geography.

A number of faculty, including Ulack, Watkins, Raitz, and Brunn, worked with faculty in the College of Education; they offered summer classes for teachers and worked with other professional geographers in the state, with teachers in the Kentucky Geographic Alliance (associated with the National Geographic Society) and with staff in the state's Department of Education. Brunn and Raitz also served as State Geographer. Rowles, Ulack, Watkins, Raitz, and Brunn at the same time worked with the director and others in the Appalachian Studies Center on various research projects and outreach programs. Other faculty established linkages with units on campus, including the Patterson School (Bladen, Karan, Brunn), Behavioral Sciences (Shannon), Center on Aging (Rowles and Watkins), Economics (Leinbach), Anthropology (Raitz), and the College of Communications (Brunn). A number of faculty cooperated with colleagues throughout the university on a variety of programs to internationalize the university; these included Leinbach, Ulack, Karan, Withington, and Brunn. Discipline-wise the department increased its visibility with Stan Brunn editing The Professional Geographer and later the Annals of the AAG, and with Tom Leinbach's appointment as NSF Program Director for Geography and Regional Science and his editing of Growth and Change. Several faculty became active in SEDAAG, especially Brunn and Raitz, who served as president (1991–93). A summer field station in Kyushu, Japan was established to train students for field research in Japan and the international field experiences of the department were expanded in the late 1990s to include Oaxaca, Mexico.

1980s and 1990s: geography and social theory

Richard Ulack's appointment as chair of the department in 1988 energized the department's upward trajectory in the college, on campus, and in the discipline. It was during his tenure that the department began to develop one of its current major strengths: a center for critical social theory. The department played a central role in initiating and advancing this program during the late 1980s and early 1990s on campus and in by in the discipline. John Paul Jones, Ted Schatzki from Philosophy, and Wolfgang Natter (Johns Hopkins) in Germanic Studies established the innovative multidisciplinary Committee on Social Theory in 1989. This program grew with contributions from additional faculty members in the department, including John Pickles (Penn State), Susan Roberts (Syracuse) and Richard Schein (Syracuse), the later two who joined the department in 1991 and 1993 respectively. Under the auspices of the Committee on Social Theory, geographers worked closely with colleagues in Philosophy, English, History, Sociology, and Political Science. Committee founder Wolfgang Natter later joined the department in 1998 (leaving the department in 2005 for Virginia Tech) and Ted Schatzki took up a joint appointment (Philosophy and Geography).

During this time, the department's international visibility remained strong with John Paul Jones serving as editor of the Annals of the AAG (1997–2000), Jones and Roberts organizing a 1995 workshop on New Horizons in Feminist Geography, a number of faculty being active on AAG committees and in AAG specialty groups, and actively participating in numerous national and international conferences. The department's annual research productivity, including books, chapters, and presentations, etc. was instrumental in attracting strong applicants for entrance into the graduate program from the 1980s through the present. Students were active in contributing papers at SEDAAG and AAG meetings, working with faculty on research grants, and publishing articles with faculty or on their own.

The department's commitment to human geography was strengthened through participation in the women's studies program (now the Department of Gender & Women's Studies). Heidi Nast's (McGill) addition as a visiting assistant professor in 1994 was instrumental in the department's development of coursework and seminars on geography and gender. Haripriya Rangan (UCLA) took up a visiting assistant professor position in the department in 1995 and taught courses on resource use, non-Western environmental movements, and regional development. A further commitment to working with colleagues in women's studies was made with the faculty supporting the transfer of Paola Bachetta (Sorbonne) from the UK Department of Sociology in 1999 and the hiring of Anna Secor (Colorado) in 2000, when Bachetta left the department to accept a position at Berkeley.

When John Pickles departed to take up an endowed chair at the University of North Carolina at Chapel Hill and John Paul Jones III became Dean of the College of Social and Behavioral Sciences at the University of Arizona in 2003, the chair, Karl Raitz, convinced the administration to authorize a mid-rank faculty hire. The department offered this position to Tad Mutersbaugh who moved from the University of Iowa in 2003, deepening the department's strengths in political ecology. The department also hired Matthew Zook (Berkeley) in 2001 and Michael Crutcher (LSU) in 2003 (he left the department in 2011), with strengths in economic and internet geographies and cultural and historical geography, respectively. The intellectual life of the department during the 1990s and early 2000s was also enriched by a number of postdoctoral fellows and visiting scholars, including: Miguel de Oliver (Penn State), Heidi Nast (McGill), Amy Mills (UT-Austin), Alan Hudson (Cambridge), Ian Hay (Adelaide), Kristine Miranne (Wayne State), Caroline Nagel (Colorado), Tara Maddock (Ohio State), Perry Carter (Ohio State), Shantha Hennayake (Peradeniya), Nalini Hennayake (Peradeniya), Michael Crutcher (LSU), and Kathleen O'Reilly (Iowa). This period also saw the formation of a productive faculty exchange program with the School of Geography at the University of Nottingham that ran from 2003 to 2007.

The department grew from strength to strength when in 2006, two assistant professor lines and two associate professor lines were authorized. Michael Samers (Oxford) and Andrew Wood (Ohio State University) were appointed as associate professors from the University of Nottingham and University of Oklahoma, respectively, to extend course offerings in economic and urban geography. Patricia Ehrkamp (Minnesota) and Morgan Robertson (UW-Madison) joined as assistant professors from Miami University and the U.S. Environmental Protection Agency, respectively. Ehrkamp, with strengths in feminist and political geographies, and Robertson, as a political ecologist, orchestrated the return of the Mini-Conference on Critical Geography to the UK the following fall in 2007. Marshall Wilkinson (Macquarie) also joined as visiting faculty in physical geography and geomorphology in 2006 and promoted to tenure-track in 2007 (he left the department in 2010). Jeff Levy (BA Kentucky) was also hired as department GIS analyst in 2006, joining Gilbreath in the cartography lab. Dick Ulack retired from the department in 2007 (he died in April 2011).

2000: strengthening physical geography
During the late 1990s, Linda Roth (Clark) offered courses in physical geography and biogeography a few years before her untimely death. The faculty for years, including in five-year plans, agreed that it was important to develop on such concentrations, following university commitment in 1989, not only to provide balanced course instruction for the undergraduate students, but also to appeal to existing and potential graduate students interested in human/environmental interfaces. The department's standing as a state-recognized Research Challenge Trust Fund department in the 1990s, one of only ten such programs on campus, enabled the department to hire a full professor to develop the physical geography program. Jonathan Phillips moved to the department in 2000 from Texas A&M. He was given a broad set of responsibilities that included oversight in hiring new physical geography faculty, building a physical geography component to the graduate program, offering additional physical geography classes, setting up a physical geography lab, and working with other university faculty in the earth sciences and environmental studies. The department hired Alice Turkington (Queens-Belfast) in 2001 and Sean Campbell (Arkansas) in 2002 to strengthen the physical cluster (Campbell left in 2006). Rosemary Sherriff (Colorado) joined faculty in 2008 to offer courses in landscape ecology (she left the department in 2010). Daehyun Kim (Texas A&M) was appointed in 2009 to extend offerings in biogeography and spatial analysis. In 2011, the physical geography faculty expanded with the hiring of Tony Stallins (Georgia) from Florida State and Liang Liang (UW-Milwaukee), with interests in human-organism geographies and phenology, respectively.

Late 2000s: political ecology

Susan Roberts was named chair of the department in 2008. Tom Leinbach retired in May 2009 (he died in December 2009). Morgan Robertson's appointment augmented Mutersbaugh's work and catalyzed political ecology within the department. In the Spring of 2011, the graduate students hosted the first Dimensions of Political Ecology (DOPE) conference, which has since grown to become an internationally recognized event. Robertson returned to UW-Madison in Spring of 2013.

Trushna Parekh (UT-Austin) served as a postdoctoral fellow, 2008 to 2011, and Sandra Zupan (UW-Milwaukee) was lecturer, 2010 to 2013.

Following Roberts's term, Anna Secor served as interim chair, 2012 to 2013. Around this time, a number of faculty won Fulbright awards. Schein was the Bicentennial Chair in North American Studies at the University of Helsinki, Finland, 2012 to 2013. Fulbright Fellowships were also won by Roberts (University of Turku, Finland, 2012 to 2013), Samers (Université de Lille II, France, 2013 to 2014), and Zook (University of Tartu, Estonia, 2013 to 2014). In addition, Matthew W. Wilson (hired in 2011) was a visiting assistant professor at Harvard University. In 2013, Lynn Phillips moved to the tenure track, following several years of service as a lecturer in the department, after receiving a PhD in city planning at the University of Louisville. Secor received recognition in 2015 when the university named her named the Hajja Razia Sharif Sheikh Islamic Studies Professor.

Rich Schein was appointed the eighth chair of the department in 2013. Betsy Beymer-Farris (Illinois) joined the faculty from Furman University in 2014 to further expand offerings in political ecology, with research concentrations in Africa. Raitz retired in 2014 and Brunn retired in 2015. Carolyn Finney (Clark) joined the faculty from Berkeley in 2015, with research interests in the cultural geographies of the environment.

Early 2010s: critical mapping

In the early 1970s, Gyula (Julius) Pauer (Kentucky) was appointed director of the department's cartography laboratory. In addition to teaching introductory and advanced cartography courses, he operated the laboratory, initially in a small room in Patterson Office Tower before it moved to the nearby and renovated Miller Hall basement in 1987. When Michael Kennedy joined the department from the College of Architecture in 1991, he began the department's GIS program with only a single computer. The hiring of Francis Harvey (Washington) in 1998 strengthened the department's GIS and social theory offerings. This concretized interests of the faculty in the GIS & Society debates of the 1990s. Edited by Pickles, Ground Truth was published in 1995 with contributions from Roberts, Schein, Jon Goss (Kentucky), and Pat McHaffie (Kentucky) -- this text quickly catalyzed the development of critical GIS. When Julius Pauer retired in 1997, the department received permission to hire a permanent staff line a director of the Cartographic Laboratory: Richard (Dick) Gilbreath (MA Kentucky). In 1998, Ulack, Raitz, and Pauer also edited a second Atlas of Kentucky.

Michael Kennedy's phased retirement created an opportunity to grow the GIS and cartography faculty. Drawing on the GIS & Society tradition begun by Pickles and Harvey (who left for Minnesota in 2001), the department appointed two new faculty in 2011: Jeremy Crampton (Penn State) from Georgia State and Matthew W. Wilson (Washington) from Ball State. Crampton, Wilson, and Zook founded the New Mappings Collaboratory in Fall of 2011, joining another UK-centered research activity on internet geographies, led by Zook since 2009: Floating Sheep.

With support to establish online certificate and degree programs in digital mapping, the department hired Rich Donohue (Wisconsin) as a postdoctoral researcher in 2014. Donohue, along with Zook, Wilson, and Crampton, developed New Maps Plus, expanding cartography and GIS coursework in web-based interactive cartography, geovisualization, and map design. New Maps Plus offers an entirely online graduate certificate in digital mapping and an online Master of Science in Digital Mapping. The first students to earn this MS degree graduated in 2019.

Late 2010s: expanding the faculty

The late-2010s included a number of changes in the faculty, including the death of P.P Karan in 2018 after over 60 years of serving the department and university. In 2016, after serving a year as Associate Dean of International Affairs, Sue Roberts was appointed Associate Provost for Internationalization. Upon promotion to Associate Dean of Faculty in 2017, Rich Schein stepped down as chair. Patricia Ehrkamp was appointed chair, only the ninth chair of the department in nearly 75 years. After several years as an affiliated member of the department, Ted Schatzki (Berkeley) joined the department, having previously served as Associate Dean of Faculty and Professor of Philosophy at Kentucky. Daehyun Kim left the department in 2017, returning to Seoul National University and Jeremy Crampton left the department in 2018 to join the faculty at Newcastle University. Carolyn Finney also left the faculty in 2018. In 2018, the department welcomed four new assistant professors. Jack Gieseking (CUNY) and Nick Lally (Wisconsin) expanded the offerings in digital geographies. Nari Senanayake's (Penn State) research and teaching in health geographies and Priscilla McCutcheon's (Georgia) work in food justice represent new offerings for the department. Boyd Shearer was also made a permanent lecturer. In 2019, Anna Secor joined the faculty at Durham University, while Rich Donohue was appointed as assistant professor. As part of an effort to support the African American and African Studies program, Lydia Pelot-Hobbs (CUNY) was hired in 2019, but deferred for a year to complete post-doctoral research at NYU.

Early 2020s: COVID-19 and environmental studies

The arrival of COVID-19 in Kentucky led to the first video conference meeting for the entire department (with over 30 participants) on 25 March 2020. On May 6, 2020, the department conducted a virtual graduation ceremony/Semple Day (renamed Geography in the Bluegrass Day) to recognize the accomplishments of graduating students. After over 40 years of service to the department, Gary Shannon retired in June of 2020. Jonathan Phillips retired after his last semester of teaching in the Fall of 2020. The interdisciplinary major of environmental and sustainability studies moved under the department's administration, led by efforts of Betsy Beymer-Farris. This followed a revision of the undergraduate major in the summer of 2020, including the offering of a new minor in urban studies. A new online graduate program in applied environmental and sustainability studies (AENS) was also launched, with support from a postdoctoral hire: Kathryn Gillespie (Washington). In 2022, Matthew Wilson was appointed as interim chair, and Jack Gieseking and Katie Gillespie left the program. To support AENS, Clare Beer (UCLA) was hired as a visiting assistant professor in 2023.

Current research

Research in the department is organized in the following research clusters:
Black Geographies
Critical Financial Geographies
Critical Mapping and GIS
Digital Geographies
Environmental Geographies
Political Ecology
Political Geographies
Queer and Feminist Geographies
Social Theory
Urban Geographies

Notable departmental people with Wikipedia pages
John Pickles, former faculty member; now professor at the University of North Carolina at Chapel Hill
Matthew Zook, current University Research Professor in Economic Geography

Faculty

There have been over 80 faculty in the department since its founding:
 Joseph R. Schwendeman, Clark PhD, 1941 (1944 to 1967)
 Harry K. Hutter, Clark MA, 1930 (1946? to 1949?)
 Richard L. Tuthill, Columbia EdD, (1946 to 1953)
 Guy N. Parmenter, Clark MA, 1947 (1947 to 1948)
 Thomas P. Field, UNC-Chapel Hill PhD, 1948 (1948 to ?)
 Daniel Jacobson, LSU PhD, (1952 to ?)
 James A. Shear, Clark PhD, 1952 (1952 to 1961?)
 William A. Withington, Northwestern PhD, 1955 (1955 to 1989)
 P.P. Karan, Indiana PhD, 1956 (1956 to 2017)
 Forrest McElhoe, Ohio State PhD
 Dietrich Zimmer, Heidelberg PhD
 Donald Blome, Iowa PhD
 Paul Cooper, Georgia PhD
 Melvin Albaum, Ohio State PhD, 1969
 Gary Fowler, Syracuse PhD
 Roger M. McCoy, Kansas PhD, 1967
 Philip Phillips, Minnesota PhD
 Geoffrey Wall, Hull PhD, 1971
 Karl Raitz, Minnesota PhD, 1970 (1970 to 2014)
 Richard C. Jones, Ohio State PhD, 1973 (1973 to 1975)
 Ronald Garst, Michigan State PhD
 Wilford Bladen, Kentucky PhD, 1972 (1973 to ?)
 Richard Ulack, Penn State PhD, 1972 (1974 to 2007)
 Richard I. Towber, Washington PhD, 1974
 Allan Fitzsimmons, UCLA PhD
 Thomas R. Leinbach, Penn State PhD, 1971 (1977 to 2009)
 Gary Shannon, Michigan PhD, (1977 to 2020)
 Robert Cromley, Ohio State PhD, 1978 (1978 to 1983)
 Macel M. Wheeler?, Kentucky PhD, 1978
 Justin Friberg, Syracuse PhD
 Henry W. Bullamore, Iowa PhD, 1978 (1978 to 1980)
 Jim Hufferd, Minnesota PhD, 1979 
 Stan Brunn, Ohio State PhD, 1966 (1980 to 2015)
 Percy Dougherty, Boston PhD, 1980
 George F. Hepner, Arizona State PhD, 1979 (1982 to 1983)
 Susan Macey, Illinois PhD, 1982 (1982 to 1983)
 Susan Trussler-Black, Penn State PhD
 Jacqueline Pryce-Harvey, Tennessee PhD
 Lizbeth Pyle, Minnesota PhD, 1983 (1983 to ?)
 Carl Amrhein, SUNY-Buffalo PhD, 1984
 Graham Rowles, Clark PhD, 1976 (1985 to present)
 John Paul Jones III, Ohio State PhD, 1984 (1986 to 2003)
 John F. Watkins, Colorado PhD, 1986 (1986 to present)
 Gyula Pauer, Kentucky PhD, (? to 1997)
 John Pickles, Penn State PhD, 1983 (1990 to 2001)
 Michael Kennedy, Louisville MS, 1978 (1991 to 2011)
 Susan Roberts, Syracuse PhD, 1992 (1991 to present)
 Richard Schein, Syracuse PhD, 1989 (1993 to present)
 Heidi Nast, McGill PhD, 1992 (1994 to 1995)
 Haripriya Rangan, UCLA PhD, 1993 (1995 to 1997)
 Wolfgang Natter, Johns Hopkins PhD, 1990 (1998 to 2005)
 Francis Harvey, Washington PhD, 1996 (1998 to 2001)
 Linda C. Roth, Clark PhD, 1997
 Paola Bachetta, Sorbonne PhD, 1996 (1999 to 2000)
 Hilary Lambert Hopper, Clark PhD, 1984
 Jonathan Phillips, Rutgers PhD, 1985 (2000 to 2020)
 Anna Secor, Colorado PhD, 2000 (2000 to 2019)
 Adrian Smith, Sussex PhD, 1996 (2000 to ?)
 Lynn Phillips, Louisville PhD, 2013 (2001 to present)
 Alice Turkington, Queens-Belfast PhD, 2001 (2001 to present)
 Matthew Zook, Berkeley PhD, 2001 (2001 to present)
 Sean Campbell, Arkansas PhD, (2002 to ?)
 Michael Crutcher, LSU PhD, 2001? (2003 to 2011)
 Tad Mutersbaugh, Berkeley PhD, (2003 to present)
 Patricia Ehrkamp, Minnesota PhD, 2002 (2006 to present)
 Morgan Robertson, UW-Madison PhD, 2004 (2006 to 2013)
 Michael Samers, Oxford PhD, 1997 (2006 to present)
 Marshall Wilkinson, Macquarie PhD, (2006 to 2010)
 Andrew Wood, Ohio State PhD, 1993 (2006 to present)
 Rosemary Sherriff, Colorado PhD, 2004 (2008 to 2010)
 Daehyun Kim, Texas A&M PhD, 2009 (2009 to 2017)
 Sandra Zupan, UW-Milwaukee PhD, 2010 (2010 to 2013)
 Jeremy Crampton, Penn State PhD, 1994 (2011 to 2018)
 Liang Liang, UW-Milwaukee PhD, 2009 (2011 to present)
 J. Anthony Stallins, Georgia PhD, 2000 (2011 to present)
 Matthew W. Wilson, Washington PhD, 2009 (2011 to present)
 Betsy Beymer-Farris, Illinois PhD, 2011 (2014 to present)
 Carolyn Finney, Clark PhD, (2015 to 2018)
 Ted Schatzki, Berkeley PhD, 1986 (2018 to present)
 Jack Gieseking, CUNY PhD, 2013 (2018 to 2022)
 Nick Lally, Wisconsin PhD, 2018 (2018 to present)
 Nari Senanayake, Penn State PhD, 2018 (2018 to present)
 Priscilla McCutcheon, Georgia PhD, (2018 to present)
 Boyd Shearer, Kentucky MA, 1998 (2018 to present)
 Rich Donohue, Wisconsin PhD, 2014 (2014 to 2019 as postdoc, 2019 to present)
 Lydia Pelot-Hobbs, CUNY PhD, 2019 (2019 to present)
 Katie Gillespie, Washington PhD, 2014 (2020 to 2022 as postdoc)
 Clare Beer, UCLA PhD, 2022 (2023 to present)

References

External links

Geography education in the United States
University of Kentucky